Juan Avilés Farré is a Spanish historian and professor at the Spanish National University of Distance Education.

Works

References

External links 

 

Living people
21st-century Spanish historians
Historians of anarchism
Historians of the Spanish Civil War
1950 births
Complutense University of Madrid alumni
Academics and writers on the international relations of Spain
Historians of the Second Spanish Republic
Experts on terrorism
20th-century Spanish historians